The Shire of Kyneton was a local government area about  northwest of Melbourne, the state capital of Victoria, Australia.

History

Kyneton was incorporated as a road district on 8 February 1859, and became a shire on 18 January 1865. Martin McKenna, a brewer, miner, pastoralist and politician, was the first president of the Shire of Kyneton.

On 19 January 1995, the Shire of Kyneton was abolished, and along with the Shires of Gisborne, Newham and Woodend and Romsey, was merged into the newly created Shire of Macedon Ranges. A small part of the shire was also transferred to the newly created Hepburn Shire.

Wards

The Shire of Kyneton was divided into four ridings, each of which elected three councillors:
 Kyneton East Riding
 Kyneton West Riding
 Trentham/Tylden Riding
 Carlsruhe/Malmsbury Riding

Towns and localities
 Baynton
 Carlsruhe
 East Trentham
 Edgecombe
 Fern Hill
 Green Hill
 Kyneton*
 Lauriston
 Malmsbury
 Newbury
 Pastoria
 Pastoria East
 Piper's Creek
 Sidonia
 Spring Hill
 Trentham
 Tylden

* Council seat.

Population

* Estimate in the 1958 Victorian Year Book.

References

External links
 Victorian Places - Kyneton Shire

Kyneton
Kyneton, Victoria